Squaw Creek may refer to:

Places
 Dollis Creek (formerly known as "Squaw Creek"), a tributary of the Tatshenshini River that traverses the British Columbia-Yukon border in western Canada 
 Loess Bluffs National Wildlife Refuge, formerly known as "Squaw Creek National Wildlife Refuge", in northwestern Missouri
 Squaw Creek (Pit River), a tributary of the Pit River in northern California, United States
 Chief Eagle Eye Creek (formerly Squaw Creek), a tributary of the Payette River in western Idaho, United States
 Ioway Creek (Ames, Iowa), formerly known as "Squaw Creek", a tributary of the South Skunk River in central Iowa, United States
 Squaw Creek Bridge 1 (1917) Harrison Township, Boone County, Iowa, USA; an NRHP bridge
 Squaw Creek Bridge 2 (1918) Harrison Township, Boone County, Iowa, USA; an NRHP bridge
 Granite Mountain Reservoir, in Nevada, United States, formerly known as "Squaw Valley Reservoir" and "Squaw Creek Reservoir"
 Comanche Creek Reservoir in Texas, which provides cooling water for Comanche Peak Nuclear Generating Station. Formerly known as "Squaw Creek Reservoir."
 Washeshu Creek (formerly known as "Squaw Creek"), a tributary of the Truckee River in the U.S. states of California and Nevada.
 Comanche Creek (Paluxy River), inflow and outflow of the Reservoir in Hood and Somervell Counties, Texas
 Whychus Creek (formerly known as "Squaw Creek"), a tributary of the Deschutes River in central Oregon, United States

Other uses
 Squaw Creek Southern Railroad, a rail company operating in Georgia and Indiana

See also

 Squaw Run (Allegheny River tributary), Allegheny County, Pennsylvania, USA
 Tahc'a Okute Wakpa, Oglala Lakota County, South Dakota, USA; a stream formerly known as "Squaw-Humper Creek"
 Squaw (disambiguation)
 Creek (disambiguation)